Toyin Enitan Raji  (born c. 1972) is a Nigerian former actress who was crowned Most Beautiful Girl in Nigeria and represented her country at the Miss Universe 1995 pageant in Windoek Namibia and at the Miss World 1995 pageant held in Sun 
City South African.Raji distinguished herself as Nigeria’s representative at the 1995 Miss Universe pageant in Namibia, finishing in 11th place. Miss South Africa had finished in 10th to deny Raji the chance of becoming Nigeria’s first Miss Universe semi–finalist, although she was awarded the "Miss Cogeniality" prize. 
The irony became more glaring later in 1995 when Raji went to South Africa for the Miss World contest. A huge favourite for the crown, Raji was prevented from participating following political controversy over Sani Abacha’s decision to execute nine dissidents. However, she was awarded the "Miss Personality" prize.

After appearing in a few Nollywood movies, Raji relocated to the US where she now lives with her daughter and husband.

Miss Universe 1995
As the official representative of Nigeria to the Miss Universe 1995 pageant, broadcast live from Windhoek, Namibia on 12 May 1995, Raji placed 11th overall in the preliminary competition, 7th in a preliminary interview, and 12th in a swimsuit, barely missing the semi-finals by five-hundredths of a point.

Augustine Masilela of South Africa made the cut in 10th place, denying Raji the chance of becoming Nigeria's first Miss Universe semi-finalist. Nonetheless, Raji received the Congeniality award, voted by her fellow contestants.

Miss World 1995
A few months later, Raji participated in the Miss World 1995 pageant, held in Sun City, South Africa on 18 November 1995. She was pressured to withdraw by South African authorities following political controversy over de facto Nigerian president Sani Abacha's decision to execute nine dissidents. Toyin still went on to win  the Miss Personality award

Personal life
After appearing in several Nollywood movies and Sunny Ade's Ololufe video, Raji relocated to  Texas, completed her education and currently works in IT.

See also 

 List of Youruba people
 List of Nigerian actress

References

External links

1970s births
20th-century Nigerian actresses
Actresses from Lagos
American people of Yoruba descent
Beauty pageant contestants from Lagos
Living people
Miss Universe 1995 contestants
Most Beautiful Girl in Nigeria winners
Nigerian emigrants to the United States
Nigerian expatriate actresses in the United States
Yoruba actresses
Yoruba beauty pageant contestants
Nigerian film actresses
21st-century Nigerian actresses
Nigerian beauty pageant contestants
Most Beautiful Girl in Nigeria contestants